The Hebrew Theological College, known colloquially as "Skokie Yeshiva" or HTC, is a yeshiva in Skokie, Illinois. Although the school's primary focus is the teaching of Torah and Jewish tradition, it is also a private university that is part of the Touro College and University System which hosts separate programs for men and women. Founded as a Modern Orthodox institution, it has evolved to include students from Haredi and Hasidic backgrounds.

History and mission
Hebrew Theological College (HTC) was founded in 1921 in the city of Chicago by Chaim Tzvi Rubinstein (b.1872—d.1944) and Saul Silber (b.1876—d.1946). Rubinstein, an alumnus of Volozhin Yeshiva, had arrived in the United States in 1917; Silber, a pulpit rabbi in Chicago, served as president of the school for its first twenty-five years. They were followed by Oscar Z. Fasman (b.1946—d.1964), Simon G. Kramer (b.1964—d.1970), and Irving J. Rosenbaum. Don Well was president from 1981—1989, followed by Jerold Isenberg from 1989—2013. Shmuel Leib Schuman became interim CEO in 2013.

HTC's original location was at 3448 West Douglas Boulevard in the North Lawndale community. It later moved to Skokie, a northern suburb of Chicago, in 1958.

Throughout its history, HTC's leadership has been shared by its rosh yeshiva and its Chief Executive Officer (CEO), formerly known as the President, and subsequently as the Chancellor.

HTC was founded as a Modern Orthodox institution of higher education. It has since evolved to include students from Haredi and Hasidic backgrounds. The school's primary purpose is to prepare students for the assumption of formal roles as educators, as well as to train eligible students to meet the requirements and demands of semikhah (rabbinical ordination). As its secondary purpose, it endeavors to provide its students with broad cultural perspectives and a strong background in the Liberal Arts and Sciences to facilitate a creative synthesis of general and Jewish knowledge. In so doing, the college also provides a foundation for the pursuit of advanced professional training.

Organization
The yeshiva consists of a beth midrash (rabbinical school); the Bellows Kollel, with some of the kollel members studying for semikhah in a program led by Chaim Twerski; the Blitstein Institute for Women; and the Fasman Yeshiva High School. The college is composed of the Bressler School of Advanced Hebrew Studies and the Kanter School of Liberal Arts and Sciences. All students complete a Bachelor of Arts in Judaic Studies through the Bressler School, with the option of a second major through the Kanter School.

The men's program offers a B.A. with a focus in Judaic studies and specifically Talmud, with second majors offered in Business, Accounting, and Psychology. The woman's program, located on a separate campus at the Blistein Institute for Women, offers Judaic Studies majors in Bible, Hebrew Language, and Jewish History, with dual majors available in Business, Computer and Information Sciences, Education (including Elementary and Special Education), English, Health Sciences and Psychology. 

The College is accredited by the North Central Association of Colleges and Schools.

Notable people

Roshei yeshiva
Nissan Yablonsky, an alumnus of Slabodka, served as the first rosh yeshiva for the first few years, followed by Chaim Korb. Chaim Zimmerman served as rosh yeshiva from 1947 to 1966.

Simon Kramer was appointed president. Under his stewardship, HTC reached its highest enrollment with approximately 300 students in the high school and 200 in the college. Aaron Soloveichik became rosh yeshiva in 1966, but after being forced out in 1974, he founded Yeshivas Brisk in Chicago. In 1985, Shlomo Morgenstern, an alumnus of Hebron Yeshiva, became rosh yeshiva, serving in that position for 22 years. On January 27, 2008, Avraham Friedman was named rosh yeshiva.

Other roshei yeshiva included:
 Yosef Babad
 Nachman Barr
 Avrahom Yitzchok Cordon
 Eliezer Y. Gottleib,
 Yaakov Greenberg
 Moshe Hershler
 Dovid Kaganoff
 Hirsch Isenberg
 Herzel Kaplan
 Yisrael Mendel Kaplan
 Chaim Kreiswirth
 Yosef Leff
 Yechezkel Lichtman
 Dovid Lifshitz
 Chaim Mednick
 Elazar Muskin
 Chaim Dovid Regensberg
 Mordechai Rogow
 Chaim Zvi Rubenstein
 Nachum Sachs
 Yitzchak Sender
 Zelig Starr
 Zvi Teller
 Moshe Wernick

Faculty
Notable faculty include the rosh yeshiva, Avraham Friedman and Chaim Twerski. Notable past members of the faculty include Eliezer Berkovits, chairman of the department of Jewish philosophy from 1958 until 1967, and Yaakov Perlow, the Novominsker Rebbe, Chaver Moetzes Gedolei HaTorah in America.

Alumni
 David Applebaum
 David Bigman, rosh yeshivat Ma'ale Gilboa
 Charles Ber Chavel
 Nosson Tzvi Finkel, rosh yeshiva, Mir Jerusalem
 Moshe Gottesman, rabbi, educator and community leader
 Yehiel Mark Kalish, member of the Illinois General Assembly, 16th House District
 Menachem Kellner
 Moshe Kletenik, Av Beis Din Seattle
 Moses Mescheloff
 Don Patinkin (1922–1995)), Israeli-American economist, and President of the Hebrew University of Jerusalem
 Abraham J. Twerski, Hasidic rabbi and psychiatrist
 Berel Wein, rabbi, lecturer and writer
 Chaim Zimmerman

See also
 List of Jewish universities and colleges in the United States
 Bar-Ilan University
 Lander College for Men
 Jerusalem College of Technology
 Yeshiva University
 History of the Jews in Chicago

References

External links
Official website

Education in Skokie, Illinois
Educational institutions established in 1922
Orthodox Judaism in Chicago
Orthodox Jewish universities and colleges
Orthodox yeshivas in the United States
Universities and colleges in Chicago
Universities and colleges in Cook County, Illinois
Jewish seminaries
Seminaries and theological colleges in Illinois
1922 establishments in Illinois